It's a Wonderful World is a 1939 American romantic screwball comedy-mystery film, starring Claudette Colbert and James Stewart and directed by W. S. Van Dyke.

Cast 

 Claudette Colbert as Edwina Corday
 James Stewart as Guy Johnson
 Guy Kibbee as Fred 'Cap' Streeter
 Nat Pendleton as Sergeant Fred Koretz
 Frances Drake as Vivian Tarbel
 Edgar Kennedy as Lieutenant Miller
 Ernest Truex as Willie Heyward
 Richard Carle as Major I. E. Willoughby, the head of Guy's detective agency
 Cecilia Callejo as Dolores Gonzales
 Sidney Blackmer as Al Mallon
 Andy Clyde as 'Gimpy' Wilson
 Cliff Clark as Captain Haggerty, the frustrated boss of bumblers Koretz and Miller
 Cecil Cunningham as Madame J. L. Chambers
 Leonard Kibrick as Herman Plotka
 Hans Conried as Mr. Delmonico, Stage Manager
 Conrad Veidt as George Richard
 Brandon Hurst as Paul Henry
 Grady Sutton as Lupton Peabody
 George Chandler as Photographer (uncredited)
 Lester Dorr as Photographer (uncredited)
 George Meeker as Ned Brown (uncredited)

Filming locations 
San Diego, California

References

External links 
 
 
 
 

1939 films
1930s crime comedy films
1939 romantic comedy films
1930s screwball comedy films
American black-and-white films
American romantic comedy films
American screwball comedy films
1930s comedy mystery films
Films directed by W. S. Van Dyke
Films shot in San Diego
Metro-Goldwyn-Mayer films
Films with screenplays by Herman J. Mankiewicz
Films with screenplays by Ben Hecht
American comedy mystery films
Films scored by Edward Ward (composer)
1930s English-language films
1930s American films